Dip angle may refer to:
 Magnetic dip, the angle of the Earth's magnetic field lines relative to the horizontal
 Dip (geology), the angle of a planar geological feature relative to the horizontal
 Dip angle, the angle between the apparent and the astronomical horizons

See also 
 Dip (disambiguation)